The Nueva Vizcaya State University is a public university in the Philippines.  It is mandated to provide advanced instruction and professional training in agriculture, arts, science, technology, education and other related fields.  It is also mandated to undertake research and extension services, and provide progressive leadership in its area of specialization.  Its main campus is located in Bayombong, Nueva Vizcaya, Philippines.

Profile
Established in 1916, Nueva Vizcaya State University is a non-profit public higher education institution located in the urban setting of the medium-sized town of Bayombong (population range of 10,000-49,999 inhabitants), Cagayan Valley. This institution has also branch campuses in the following location(s): Bambang. Officially accredited and/or recognized by the Commission on Higher Education, Philippines, Nueva Vizcaya State University (NSVU) is a medium-sized (uniRank enrollment range: 8,000-8,999 students) coeducational higher education institution. Nueva Vizcaya State University (NSVU) offers courses and programs leading to officially recognized higher education degrees such as pre-bachelor degrees (i.e. certificates, diplomas, associate or foundation degrees), bachelor degrees, master degrees, doctorate degrees in several areas of study. See the uniRank degree levels and areas of study matrix below for further details. This 101 years old higher-education institution has a selective admission policy based on entrance examinations. International applicants are eligible to apply for enrollment. NSVU also provides several academic and non-academic facilities and services to students including a library, housing, sport facilities and/or activities, financial aids and/or scholarships, study abroad and exchange programs, online courses and distance learning opportunities, as well as administrative services.

Media
Since 2008, the university has its own radio station called 96.5 UFM (DWNS 96.5 MHz).

References

Universities and colleges in Nueva Vizcaya
State universities and colleges in the Philippines